Nuestra Belleza Nuevo León 2001, was held at the Museo del Vidrio in Monterrey, Nuevo León on July 18, 2001. At the conclusion of the final night of competition Diana García of Monterrey was crowned the winner. García was crowned by outgoing Nuestra Belleza Nuevo León titleholder, Verónica Gutiérrez. four contestants competed for the title.

Results

Placements

Contestants

References

External links
Official Website

Nuestra Belleza México